The World Is Yours is the third studio album by The Union, the English rock band formed by ex-Thunder guitarist Luke Morley and Peter Shoulder (formerly of Winterville). It was released on 11 February 2013. The album was funded by a PledgeMusic campaign, which had already passed the 200 percent mark by November 2012.

The band embarked on a ten-date tour of the UK in February 2013 in support of The World Is Yours.

Track listing
All tracks produced, written and arranged by Luke Morley and Peter Shoulder.

Personnel
 Peter Shoulder — lead vocals, guitar, mandolin, piano, Hammond organ, lap steel
 Luke Morley — guitar, vocals, percussion
 Chris Childs — bass guitar
 Dave McCluskey — drums

Guest musicians
Helena May Harrison — backing vocals
Katy Burgess — backing vocals

Production
 Peter Shoulder and Luke Morley — production
 Rupert Coulson — engineering and mixing
 Andrew Thompson — mastering
 Brian Smith — assistant engineer at Tackle Out
 Ben Matthews — assistant engineer at Walton Castle
 Artwork, design and photography courtesy of Hugh Gilmour, Marty Moffatt and Jason Joyce

References

The Union (band) albums
2013 albums